The 2019 All England Open (officially known as the Yonex All England Open Badminton Championships 2019 for sponsorship reasons) was a badminton tournament which took place at Arena Birmingham in England from 6 to 10 March 2019. It had a total purse of $1,000,000.

Tournament
The 2019 All England Open was the sixth tournament of the 2019 BWF World Tour and also part of the All England Open championships, which had been held since 1899. This tournament was organized by Badminton England and sanctioned by the BWF.
Ticket price for 2019 All England Open started at £16 for adults and at £5 for children.

Venue
This international tournament was held at Arena Birmingham in Birmingham, England.

Point distribution
Below is the point distribution for each phase of the tournament based on the BWF points system for the BWF World Tour Super 1000 event.

Prize money
The total prize money for this year's tournament was US$1,000,000. Distribution of prize money was in accordance with BWF regulations.

Men's singles

Seeds

 Kento Momota (champion)
 Shi Yuqi (semi-finals)
 Chou Tien-chen (first round)
 Chen Long (first round)
 Son Wan-ho (first round)
 Viktor Axelsen (final)
 Srikanth Kidambi (quarter-finals)
 Anthony Sinisuka Ginting (first round)

Finals

Top half

Section 1

Section 2

Bottom half

Section 3

Section 4

Women's singles

Seeds

 Tai Tzu-ying (final)
 Nozomi Okuhara (semi-finals)
 Chen Yufei (champion)
 Akane Yamaguchi (semi-finals)
 P. V. Sindhu (first round)
 He Bingjiao (quarter-finals)
 Ratchanok Intanon (first round)
 Saina Nehwal (quarter-finals)

Finals

Top half

Section 1

Section 2

Bottom half

Section 3

Section 4

Men's doubles

Seeds

 Marcus Fernaldi Gideon / Kevin Sanjaya Sukamuljo (first round)
 Li Junhui / Liu Yuchen (first round)
 Takeshi Kamura / Keigo Sonoda (semi-finals)
 Hiroyuki Endo / Yuta Watanabe (second round)
 Kim Astrup / Anders Skaarup Rasmussen (second round)
 Mohammad Ahsan / Hendra Setiawan (champions)
 Han Chengkai / Zhou Haodong (quarter-finals)
 Fajar Alfian / Muhammad Rian Ardianto (semi-finals)

Finals

Top half

Section 1

Section 2

Bottom half

Section 3

Section 4

Women's doubles

Seeds

 Yuki Fukushima / Sayaka Hirota (semi-finals)
 Misaki Matsutomo / Ayaka Takahashi (first round)
 Mayu Matsumoto / Wakana Nagahara (final)
 Greysia Polii / Apriyani Rahayu (quarter-finals)
 Chen Qingchen / Jia Yifan (champions)
 Lee So-hee / Shin Seung-chan (second round)
 Shiho Tanaka / Koharu Yonemoto (semi-finals)
 Gabriela Stoeva / Stefani Stoeva (quarter-finals)

Finals

Top half

Section 1

Section 2

Bottom half

Section 3

Section 4

Mixed doubles

Seeds

 Zheng Siwei / Huang Yaqiong (champions)
 Wang Yilyu / Huang Dongping (quarter-finals)
 Yuta Watanabe / Arisa Higashino (final)
 Dechapol Puavaranukroh / Sapsiree Taerattanachai (quarter-finals)
 Chan Peng Soon / Goh Liu Ying (second round)
 Chris Adcock / Gabby Adcock (quarter-finals)
 Marcus Ellis / Lauren Smith (second round)
 Hafiz Faizal / Gloria Emanuelle Widjaja (first round)

Finals

Top half

Section 1

Section 2

Bottom half

Section 3

Section 4

References

External links
 Tournament Link
 Official Website

All England Open Badminton Championships
All England Open
All England
All England
International sports competitions in Birmingham, West Midlands